Markus Salcher (born 1 June 1991) is an Austrian alpine skier and Paralympic Champion. He competed in the 2014 Winter Paralympics in Sochi, Russia, where he won two gold medals.

He won the silver medal in the men's Super-G standing event at the 2022 Winter Paralympics held in Beijing, China.

Career
Due to the sportive background of his family Markus’ first attempts on skis were undertaken early in life. At the age of only three years the first turns on skis were carved into the snow. The local ski club (SV Tröpolach in the Nassfeld skiing area) and his family helped to develop a solid skiing technique as well as a passion for the sport early on. The first racing experiences were gained at the age of five when Markus began to compete in local skiing cups against non-disabled age-peers. Even though these first races were not overly successful, the motivation to pursue a professional career as a skier did not wane. First contacts to the field of professional disabled sports were made during the winter of 2000. Since the 2003 / 2004 winter season Markus has been an active athlete member of various teams of the Austrian Skiing Federation (ÖSV). In addition to Markus’ personal ambition and self-motivation, the Sports-High School (SSLK Klagenfurt) needs to be credited with a big share in the development of the young athlete’s personal and athletic skills, from first semi-professional training programs to the acceptance into Austria’s National Skiing Team.

References

External links 
 

1991 births
Living people
Austrian male alpine skiers
Alpine skiers at the 2014 Winter Paralympics
Alpine skiers at the 2022 Winter Paralympics
Medalists at the 2014 Winter Paralympics
Medalists at the 2022 Winter Paralympics
Paralympic gold medalists for Austria
Paralympic silver medalists for Austria
Paralympic bronze medalists for Austria
Paralympic alpine skiers of Austria
Paralympic medalists in alpine skiing
21st-century Austrian people